KBSI is a television station in Cape Girardeau, Missouri, US.

KBSI may also refer to:
 Kongres Buruh Seluruh Indonesia or All-Indonesia Labour Congress, an Indonesian trade union
 Korea Basic Science Institute

See also
 BSI (disambiguation)
 CBSI (disambiguation)
 KBS (disambiguation)
 KBS 1 (disambiguation)
 WBSI (disambiguation)